The Robert A. Millikan award is a medal given to individuals who provide notable contributions to the teaching of physics. The award was established in 1962 and is awarded by the American Association of Physics Teachers (AAPT). The winner receives a monetary award and certificate and delivers an address at an AAPT summer meeting.

Award Winners

See also

 List of physics awards

References

Physics awards
American awards
Awards established in 1962
American Association of Physics Teachers